Rameshki is a rural locality (a village) in Krasnopolyanskoye Rural Settlement, Nikolsky District, Vologda Oblast, Russia. The population was 67 as of 2002. There are 3 streets.

Geography 
Rameshki is located 18 km southwest of Nikolsk (the district's administrative centre) by road. Osinovo is the nearest rural locality.

References 

Rural localities in Nikolsky District, Vologda Oblast